The Fernie Formation is a stratigraphic unit of Jurassic age. It is present in the western part of the Western Canada Sedimentary Basin in western Alberta and northeastern British Columbia. It takes its name from the town of Fernie, British Columbia, and was first defined by W.W. Leach in 1914.

Depositional history 
The Fernie Formation consists of marine sediments that were deposited in the Sundance Sea. Deposition took place throughout most of the Jurassic period, starting during the Hettangian stage in some parts of northeastern British Columbia and continuing until the mid-Tithonian, as determined from its fossil assemblages, including ammonites, molluscs and microfossils.

The sediments were sourced from the east during the deposition of the lower and middle units of the Fernie, where the coarser facies occur in the eastern part of the formation. In the uppermost Fernie, the coarsest material is found in the west, however, indicating a shift to sources in the west and south.

Lithology
The Fernie Formation is composed primarily of brown and dark gray to black shales that range from massive with conchoidal fracture to laminated and highly fractured or papery. Phosphatic sandstone and limestone, including cherty limestone, occur locally in the lower parts of the formation; siltstone, sandstone, coquinas and oolitic limestone interbeds can occur in the center; glauconitic sandstone and siltstone can be present in the upper parts.

Distribution
The Fernie Formation reaches a maximum thickness of  near Mount Allan in Alberta, and typically is about 70 to 150m (230 to 492 ft) thick. It thins toward the east, disappearing at about the longitude of Calgary. The formation is exposed in outcrops in the Kootenay region of southeastern British Columbia, in the foothills and front ranges of the Canadian Rockies in southwestern Alberta, and as far north as the Peace River Country in northeastern British Columbia.

Relationship to other units
The  Fernie Formation is conformably overlain by the Morrissey Formation in the south, by the Nikanassin Formation in central Alberta and by the Monteith Formation in northeastern British Columbia. It rests disconformably on Triassic units in the west, and unconformably on upper Paleozoic units such as the Schooler Creek Group and the Montney Formation farther east.

Subdivisions
The Fernie Formation has the following subdivisions from top to base:

See also 
 List of fossiliferous stratigraphic units in Alberta 
 List of fossiliferous stratigraphic units in British Columbia  
 Toarcian turnover
 Toarcian formations
Marne di Monte Serrone, Italy
 Calcare di Sogno, Italy
 Sachrang Formation, Austria
 Posidonia Shale, Lagerstätte in Germany
 Ciechocinek Formation, Germany and Poland
 Krempachy Marl Formation, Poland and Slovakia
 Lava Formation, Lithuania
 Azilal Group, North Africa
 Whitby Mudstone, England
 Whiteaves Formation, British Columbia
 Navajo Sandstone, Utah
 Los Molles Formation, Argentina
 Mawson Formation, Antarctica
 Kandreho Formation, Madagascar
 Kota Formation, India
 Cattamarra Coal Measures, Australia

References 

Stratigraphy of Alberta
Stratigraphy of British Columbia
Jurassic System of North America
Jurassic Alberta
Jurassic British Columbia
Hettangian Stage
Sinemurian Stage
Pliensbachian Stage
Toarcian Stage
Aalenian Stage
Callovian Stage
Bathonian Stage
Bajocian Stage
Oxfordian Stage
Kimmeridgian Stage
Tithonian Stage
Shale formations
Sandstone formations
Open marine deposits
Shallow marine deposits
Beach deposits
Fossiliferous stratigraphic units of North America
Paleontology in Alberta
Paleontology in British Columbia